Matt Kellett (born May 4, 1973 in Regina, Saskatchewan) is a former placekicker who played eight seasons in the Canadian Football League for the British Columbia Lions from 1998, 2001–2002, the Edmonton Eskimos from 1999–2001, the Montreal Alouettes in 2004 and the Ottawa Renegades in 2005 of the Canadian Football League. He won one Grey Cup for the Lions.

References

1973 births
Living people
BC Lions players
Canadian football placekickers
Edmonton Elks players
Montreal Alouettes players
Ottawa Renegades players
Players of Canadian football from Saskatchewan
Saskatchewan Huskies football players
Sportspeople from Regina, Saskatchewan